Tokers Green is a hamlet in South Oxfordshire, England, about  north of Reading, Berkshire. Its village neighbours are Chazey Heath and Kidmore End. Tokers Green is a village of houses apart from a farm. It stretches on two roads, Tokers Green Lane and Rokeby Drive.

References

 List of places in Oxfordshire

External links

Villages in Oxfordshire
South Oxfordshire District